Balsamina is an alternative name for several wine grape varieties including:

Marzemino
Syrah
Uva Rara